Cartea   is a butterfly genus in the family Riodinidae. They are resident in the Neotropics.

Species list 
 Cartea ucayala Thieme, 1907 Peru.
 Cartea vitula (Hewitson, [1852]) Brazil.

Sources
 Cartea

Riodininae
Butterfly genera
Taxa named by William Forsell Kirby